Miss America's Outstanding Teen 2008 was the 3rd Miss America's Outstanding Teen pageant held at the Linda Chapin Theater in the Orange County Convention Center in Orlando, Florida on August 11, 2007. At the conclusion of the event, Maria DeSantis of Texas crowned her successor Caitlin Brunell of Virginia. The pageant was hosted by Miss America 2007 Lauren Nelson and performer Billy Flanigan.

Results

Placements

Other Awards

Order of Announcement

Top 10 

 Louisiana
 Oklahoma
 Wisconsin
 Utah
 Florida
 Pennsylvania
 Mississippi
 Virginia
 Kentucky
 Indiana

Top 5 

 Virginia
 Utah
 Louisiana
 Kentucky
 Pennsylvania

Pageant

Selection of Contestants 
One delegate from each state, District of Columbia, and the Virgin Islands were chosen in state pageants held between September 2006 to July 2007.

Preliminaries 
During the 4 days prior to the final night, the delegates compete in the preliminary competition, which includes a private interview with the judges and a show where they compete in talent, evening wear, lifestyle and fitness in athletic wear, and on-stage question. They were held August 7-10, 2007.

Finals 
During the finals, the top 10 compete in evening wear, lifestyle and fitness in athletic wear, and talent, and the top 5 compete in on-stage question.

Contestants 
52 delegates participated:

References 

2008
2008 in Florida
2008 beauty pageants